Wulp may refer to:

 Frederik Maurits van der Wulp (1818–1899), Dutch entomologist
 John Wulp (1928–2018), American artist
 Wulp Castle, Küsnacht, Switzerland